WGE may refer to:

Places
 Walgett Airport (IATA airport code: WGE), Walgett, New South Wales, Australia
 Widukind-Gymnasium Enger, Enger, Herford, Northrhine-Westphalia, Germany; a school
 William Greenleaf Eliot College, Washington University in St. Louis, Missouri, USA; a residential college; see Campus life at Washington University in St. Louis

Groups, organizations, companies
 WGE Gang, a street gang from New Orleans
 Working Group on Environment, Greater Mekong Subregion Environment Operations Center

Other uses
 World Gasoline Engine, an automotive engine from the Global Engine Alliance (GEMA), an alliance of automotive companies
 Wheat germ extract, a type of cell extract used for cell-free protein synthesis

See also

 wage (disambiguation)